East Dorset by-election may refer to:

 1891 East Dorset by-election
 1904 East Dorset by-election
 1910 East Dorset by-election
 1921 East Dorset by-election